The Netherlands was represented by Ben Cramer, with the song "De oude muzikant", at the 1973 Eurovision Song Contest, which took place on 7 April in Luxembourg City. Cramer was selected internally by broadcaster NOS to be the Dutch representative and the song was chosen at the national final on 28 February.

The Netherlands was considered one of the most contemporary-minded countries when it came to choosing Eurovision entries, so the choice in 1973 of a stylistically and lyrically very old-fashioned song, which would not have sounded out of place in a 1950s contest, was widely regarded as rather strange.

Before Eurovision

Nationaal Songfestival 1973 
The final was held on 28 February 1973 at the Theater Carré in Amsterdam, hosted by Viola van Emmenes and Simon van Collem. Four songs were performed and voting was by eleven regional juries with 10 points each to divide between the songs. "De oude muzikant" emerged the clear winner.

At Eurovision 
On the night of the final Cramer performed 13th in the running order, following Sweden and preceding Ireland. At the close of voting "De oude muzikant" had received 69 points, placing the Netherlands 14th of the 17 entries.

The Dutch conductor at the contest was Harry van Hoof.

Voting

References

External links 
 Dutch Preselection 1973

1973
Countries in the Eurovision Song Contest 1973
Eurovision